The Father of the House is a title that is bestowed on the senior member of the House of Commons who has the longest continuous service. If two or more members have the same length of current uninterrupted service, then whoever was sworn in earliest, as listed in Hansard, is named as Father of the House.

The only formal duty of the Father of the House is to preside over the election of the Speaker of the House of Commons. However, the relevant Standing Order does not refer to this member by the title of "Father of the House", but instead to the longest-serving member of the House present who is not a Minister of the Crown. Until 1971, the Clerk of the House of Commons presided over the election of the Speaker. As the clerk is never a member, and therefore is not permitted to speak, he would silently stand and point at the Member who was to speak. However, this procedure broke down at the election of a new Speaker in 1971 and was changed upon the recommendation of a select committee.

Until 6 November 2019, the Father of the House of Commons was Kenneth Clarke, a Conservative MP until 3 September 2019, and then an independent MP, for Rushcliffe. Clarke began his continuous service at the 1970 general election. He declined to seek re-election and he retired before the 2019 general election. Dennis Skinner, Labour MP for Bolsover, also began continuous service at the 1970 general election, but was sworn in after Clarke. Skinner contested the 2019 election, but was defeated, and so Sir Peter Bottomley, who has been an MP continuously since 1975, became Father of the House.

History

Historically, the Father of the House was not a clearly defined term, and it is not clear by what process it was used for individual Members. The first recorded usage of the term dates to 1788, in an obituary of Thomas Noel; it is also attested in an engraved portrait of Whitshed Keene by Charles Picart, from 1816. It may have been interpreted at various times as the oldest member, the member with the longest total service, the member with the longest unbroken service (the modern definition), or the member who entered the House longest ago. There is also some evidence that in the late 19th century, the position may have been elected. The modern definition was not settled upon until the late 1890s.

After the Second World War, a convention arose that the Father would normally be a member of the Select Committee on Privileges, but this lapsed following the establishment of the modern Standards and Privileges Committee in the 1990s.

Among the twentieth-century Fathers, there were several very prominent figures; four former Prime Ministers became Father of the House, and a fifth, Henry Campbell-Bannerman was simultaneously Father of the House and Prime Minister from May 1907 until soon before his death during April 1908. Almost all have been Privy Councillors.

To date, all holders of the position have been men. In 2015 Harriet Harman described herself as the 'Mother of the House' as she was the longest continuously serving woman MP. David Cameron referred to her as the Mother the week after, and Theresa May referred to Harriet Harman as the Mother of the House in 2017. Harman had in fact been the longest serving female MP since at least 2010.

List of Fathers of the House since 1899 

This list covers all Fathers of the House since W.W. Beach, the first to become Father after the modern approach (longest period of continuous service) was agreed in 1898.

Earlier "Fathers"

This list covers all those who would have been considered Father of the House, by the modern definition, since an arbitrary date of 1701. Many of these will not have been considered "Father of the House" by contemporaries, and some men who were described as such are not listed here.

Longest-serving member of the House of Lords
The title 'Father of the House' is not used in the House of Lords. The longest-serving member is recorded on the House website, though no duties or special distinctions are associated with the position. , the longest-serving member is The Lord Trefgarne (Conservative), who first took his seat on 3 July 1962 (having succeeded his father in the peerage in 1960 while still a minor). The House of Lords Act 1999 repealed the automatic right of hereditary peers to be members of the House of Lords; Trefgarne was one of those elected to continue as a member under section 2 of the Act.

, the longest-serving life peer is The Baroness Gardner of Parkes (Conservative), who is also the longest-serving female member of the House. She first took her seat on 23 June 1981.

See also
 Baby of the House, the equivalent position for the youngest Member of Parliament
 Father of the House
 Dean of the House (Canada)
 Dean of the United States House of Representatives

References

External links 

House of Commons briefing paper

House of Commons of the United Kingdom
Members of the Parliament of the United Kingdom
Senior legislators
Lists of people by time in office